The Egyptian hieroglyph Rising Sun (Gardiner N28) is used to represent "coronation", and related meanings (festivals, parades, rejoicing, etc.). Its phonetic value is ḫꜥ ("kha").
It is used in the Horus name of  pharaoh Khasekhemwy (Ḫꜥj-sḫm.wj) of the  Second Dynasty.

Language usage of "Rising sun"-(Khā)

See also
Gardiner's Sign List#N. Sky, Earth, Water
List of Egyptian hieroglyphs
Sun (hieroglyph)
Egyptian biliteral signs

References

Egyptian hieroglyphs: sky-earth-water